Aesculus wangii is a species of tree in the family Sapindaceae, found in southern China (Yunnan) and northern Vietnam. It is threatened by habitat loss. Sometimes considered conspecific with Aesculus assamica.

References

wangii
Vulnerable plants
Trees of China
Trees of Vietnam
Taxonomy articles created by Polbot